The Women's 90 kg competition at the 2017 World Weightlifting Championships was held on 4 December 2017.

Schedule

Medalists

Records

 Hripsime Khurshudyan's world records were rescinded in 2016.

Results

References

External links
Results 

Women's 90 kg
2017 in women's weightlifting